The Tour du Pays de Montbéliard is a multi-day road bicycle race held annually in the French Department of Doubs. In 2021, it was added to the UCI Europe Tour calendar as a category 2.2U event, and in 2022 was changed to 2.2, removing the under-23 age limit.

The race consists of a short prologue on Friday and two circuit stages on Saturday and Sunday.

Winners

References

External links

Recurring sporting events established in 2020
2020 establishments in France
UCI Europe Tour races
Cycle races in France